Pishva Rural District is in the Central District of Pishva County, Tehran province, Iran. At the National Census of 2006, its constituent villages were in the former Pishva District of Varamin County. There were 3,892 inhabitants in 992 households at the following census of 2011. At the most recent census of 2016, the population of the rural district was 4,240 in 1,207 households, by which time the district had been separated from the county and Pishva County established. The largest of its eight villages was Qaleh Sin, with 2,892 people.

References 

Pishva County

Rural Districts of Tehran Province

Populated places in Tehran Province

Populated places in Pishva County